The Dart is a New Zealand one-design 11 foot sailing dinghy.

History
The Zephyr was designed by Auckland designer Des Townson, in the late 1950s for building in plywood.  It is a fast and attractive two person  jib headed fractional sloop rigged dinghy Des designed for the Northcote Birkenhead Yacht Club of Auckland, New Zealand.

See also

 Article on Dart class 
 List of Townson Designs - from the Zephyr Owners Association website. 
 Grahame Anderson (1999) FAST LIGHT BOATS, a Century of Kiwi Innovation.

Dinghies
1950s sailboat type designs
Sailboat type designs by Des Townson